The Catalan and Valencian orthographies encompass the spelling and punctuation of standard Catalan (set by the IEC) and Valencian (set by the AVL). There are also several adapted variants to the peculiarities of local dialects of Insular Catalan (Alguerese and the Balearic subdialects).

History
The history of the Catalan and Valencian orthographies show a singularity in regard with the other Romance languages. These have been mostly developed from Latin, adapting them to their own phonetic particularities. It had been a gradual and slow process through centuries until the creation of the Academies in the 18th century that fixed the orthography from their language dominant variety.

In the case of Catalan and Valencian, the mediaeval orthography had a noticeable homogeneity. The Royal Chancellery set a unitary written model in several fields. Thus, Ramon Muntaner expressed in his Chronicle (1325–1328) that the Catalans are the largest group with a single language, since all the Romance-speaking regions had very divided languages like the difference that exists between Catalans and Aragonese.

In the 16th century, just after the Golden Age, the split of Catalan started. With the isolation of the Royal Court and several political events, the unitary linguistic conscious and the shared cultural tradition broke off. The production became more dialectal. 

In the 19th century the recovery of the unity emerged, beginning with the orthography.  Institutions like the Acadèmia de Bones Lletres or the Floral Games were in the middle of several orthographic dilemmas. 

The orthographic norms of Catalan were first defined officially in the First International Congress of the Catalan Language, held in Barcelona October 1906. Subsequently, the Philological Section of the Institut d'Estudis Catalans (IEC, founded in 1911) published the Normes ortogràfiques in 1913 under the direction of Antoni Maria Alcover and Pompeu Fabra. Despite some opposition, the spelling system was adopted immediately and became widespread enough that, in 1932, Valencian writers and intellectuals gathered in Castelló to make a formal adoption of the so-called Normes de Castelló, a set of guidelines following Pompeu Fabra's Catalan language norms.

In 1917, Fabra published an Orthographic Dictionary following the orthographic norms of the IEC. In 1931–1932 the Diccionari General de la Llengua Catalana (General Dictionary of the Catalan language) appeared.  In 1995, a new normative dictionary, the Dictionary of the Catalan Language of the Institute of Catalan Studies (DIEC), marked a new milestone in the orthographic fixation of the language, in addition to the incorporation of neologisms and modern uses of the language.

Alphabet
Like those of many other Romance languages, the Catalan and Valencian alphabet derives from the Latin alphabet and is largely based on the respective language's phonology.

The Catalan and Valencian alphabet consists of the 26 letters of the ISO basic Latin alphabet:

The following letter-diacritic combinations are used, but they do not constitute distinct letters in the alphabet: À à, É é, È è, Í í, Ï ï, Ó ó, Ò ò, Ú ú, Ü ü and Ç ç (though the Catalan keyboard includes the letter Ç as a separate key). K k and W w are used only in loanwords. Outside loanwords, the letters Q q and Y y appear only in the digraphs qu, qü and ny. However, Y was used until the official orthography was established in 1913, when it was replaced with I, except in the digraph ny and loanwords. Some Catalan surnames conserve the letter y and the word-final digraph ch (pronounced ), e. g. Layret, Aymerich.

The following table shows the letters and their names in Standard Catalan (IEC) and Standard Valencian (AVL):

The names efa, ela, ema, ena, erra, and essa are also used in certain speeches of Valencian.

Speakers that do distinguish them use the simple names be and ve.

Spelling patterns

Spelling-to-sound correspondences

Catalan is a pluricentric language; the pronunciation of some of the letters is different in Eastern Catalan (IEC) and Valencian (AVL). Apart from those variations, the pronunciation of most consonants is fairly straightforward and is similar to French, Occitan or Portuguese pronunciation. (The following list includes a quick pronunciation of letters in standard Catalan and Valencian, for an in-depth view see attached main article on top of this section).

Diacritics

Accentuation

Acute and grave accents
Catalan and Valencian also use the acute and grave accents to mark stress or vowel quality. An acute on  indicates that the vowel is stressed and close-mid, while grave on  indicates that the vowel is stressed and open-mid. Thus, the acute is used on close or close-mid vowels, and the grave on open or open-mid vowels. For example:
 pròxim:  ('nearby')

Standard rules governing the presence of accents are based on word endings and the position of the stressed syllable. In particular, accents are expected for:
 Oxytones ending in a syllabic vowel, a vowel + -, or -/, examples:
 Paroxytones with any other ending, including non-syllabic -, -, examples:
 Any proparoxytones, examples:

Since there is no need to mark the stressed syllable of a monosyllabic word, most of them do not have an accent. Exceptions are those with a diacritical accent differentiating words that would otherwise be homographic. In most cases, the word bearing no accent is either unstressed (as in the case of 'es' and 'te'), or the word without the accent is more common, usually a function word.

The different distribution of open e  vs closed e  between Eastern Catalan and Western Catalan is reflected in some orthographic divergences between standard Catalan and Valencian norms, example:   (Catalan) vs   (Valencian) ('English'). In the Balearic Islands, open e  tends to be a centralised e in the same cases where open e contrasts with closed e in Catalan and Valencian. The cases where the difference of pronunciation of e can have graphical repercussions are the followings:
Words ending with the demonym -es (anglès / anglés 'English', francès / francés 'French'), the past participles (admès / admés 'admitted', compromès / compromés 'committed') and adjectives (cortès / cortés 'courteous').
The ordinal numerals ending in stressed e: cinquè / cinqué ('fifth'), sisè / sisé ('sixth').
The ending of the third person of the plural of indicative -en of some verbs of the 2nd conjugation (aprèn / aprén 'learn', comprèn / comprén 'comprehend', depèn / depén 'depend'), except in the cases where this ending is preceded by the consonant t or c, where it is pronounced with a closed e in all speeches (atén 'attend', entén 'understand', pretén 'pretend', encén 'switch on').
The infinitives ending in -eixer (conèixer / conéixer 'to know', merèixer / meréixer 'to deserve', parèixer / paréixer 'to seem', but uniquely créixer 'to grow') and -encer (vèncer / véncer 'to win', convèncer / convéncer 'to convince').
The second and third person of the plural of the simple past tense of indicative with accent on the radical: fèiem / féiem 'we did', fèieu / féieu 'you pl. did'.

Circumflex
The circumflex is seldom used in modern Catalan and Valencian, nonetheless it has been used in the beginning of the 19th century by Antoni Febrer i Cardona to represent schwa in the Balearic subdialects. According to the Diccionari català-valencià-balear, in modern times there are some cases where the circumflex can be used to indicate silent etymological sounds (similar to French) or a contraction. Contrary to the restrictions of the acute and grave accent, the circumflex can be used with all vowels , the most common, especially in Valencian, being  (i.e. due to the elision of ), e.g. mascletâes (instead of mascletades 'pyrotechnic festivals'), anâ (instead of anar 'to go'), témê (instead of témer 'to fear'), sortî (instead of sortir 'to exit'), pâ ('to', preposition in colloquial Valencian).

Diaeresis

This diaeresis is not used over a stressed vowel that already should have an accent.

Certain verb forms of verbs ending in -uir do not receive a diaeresis, although they are pronounced with separate syllables. This concerns the infinitive, gerund, future and conditional forms (for example traduir, traduint, traduiré and traduiria, all with bisyllabic ). All other forms of such verbs do receive a diaeresis on the ï according to the normal rules (e.g. traduïm, traduïa).

ungüent  ('ointment')

The ambiguity is resolved by an additional rule, which states that in cases where diaereses would appear on two consecutive letters, only the second receives one. This thus gives arguïm /arguˈim/, i.e. and arguïa /arguˈia/, but argüir /arˈgwir/, argüint /arˈgwint/ and argüiré /argwiˈre/ as these forms don't receive a diaeresis on the i normally, according to the exception above.

Ce trencada (c-cedilla)
Catalan and Valencian ce trencada (Ç ç), literally in English 'broken cee', is a modified  with a cedilla mark ( ¸ ). It is only used before  to indicate a soft c , much like in Portuguese, Occitan or French (e.g. compare coça  or  'kick', coca  or  'cake' and cosa  or  'thing').

Punt volat (middot)
This usage of the middot sign is a recent invention from the beginning of twentieth century (in medieval and modern Catalan, before Fabra's standardization, this symbol was sometimes used to note certain elisions, especially in poetry).

Hyphen
The hyphen (called a guionet) is used in Catalan and Valencian to separate a verb and the combination of pronouns that follow them (e.g. menjar-se-les), to separate certain compounds (e.g. vint-i-un and para-sol), and to split a word at the end of a line of text for the purpose of maintaining page margins. 

There are also compound terms in which the first element carries a grave accent (mà-llarg), the construction no plus substantive (but not no plus adjective, no-violència but the nacions no violentes) and certain singular constructions like abans-d'ahir and adéu-siau.

Since 1996, the normative set that in the none mentioned cases in the previous paragraph do not carry hyphen. Thus, the general norm set that the prefixed forms, aside from the cited exceptions, are written without hyphen (the only normative option, then, is to write arxienemic and fisicoquímic).

In regard to numbers, hyphen is set according to the D-U-C rule (Desenes-Unitats-Centenes, 'Tens-Units-Hundreds'), thus, a hyphen is placed between tens and units (quaranta-dos) and between units and hundreds (tres-cents). For example, the number 35,422 is written trenta-cinc mil quatre-cents vint-i-dos.

In the case of the separation of a term at the end of line, syllable boundaries are maintained. Still, there are digraphs that can be separated and others that cannot. The digraphs that can be separated are those that, when splitting them, they result in two graphs the corresponding sound from which they share a phonetic trait with the sound of the digraph. (Thus, the digraph rr, for example it corresponds with the nearest sound of a rhotic alveolar trill. Cor-randes, calit-ja and as-sas-sí are words with digraphs that can be split). The digraphs that cannot be separated are those in which the two graphs correspond to sounds that they are not related with the sound of the digraph. (For example, it cannot be separated the digraphs ny or ix, the sound /i/ for instance, does not have any relation with the sound of the voiceless prepalatal fricative which ix is corresponded).

To orthographic effects, the syllabic separation of words follow the following norms:

 The following digraphs and combination of letters can be separated:
 rr (car-rer), ss (pas-sar), sc (es-ce-na), l·l (vil-la), tj (jut-jat), tg (fet-ge), tx (pit-xer), tl (vet-la), tll (rot-llo), tm (rit-me), tn (cot-na), tz (set-ze), mm (im-mens), nn (in-no-cent)
 The following digraphs cannot be separated:
 gu (jo-guet), ny (pe-nya), qu (pa-quet), ig (ba-teig), ll (pe-lle-ter)
 The constituents of a compound, or the prefix of a prefixed word, can be separated:
 ad-herir, in-expert, ben-estar, mil-hòmens, des-encolar, vos-altres Letters cannot be left on their own at the end or beginning of a line:
 d'a-mor, aber-rant, l'a-plicació, histò-riaApostrophe
Catalan and Valencian follow some apostrophation rules that serve to determine whether it is necessary to use an apostrophe (') with an article, preposition or pronoun or not if the word that follows it or precedes it begins or finishes in a vowel, respectively.

Article
The masculine singular article (el, en, and dialectally also lo, in Continental Catalan, and es and so in Balearic, the so called salted article, with s) is apostrophated before all words of masculine gender that begin with a vowel, e.g. l'avió, l'encant, l'odi, n'Albert, s'arbre; with a silent h, e.g. l'home, l'ham, n'Hug, s'home; with a liquid s, e.g. l'spa, l'Stuttgart. It is not apostrophated before of words that begin with a consonantic i or u (with or without h), el iogurt, el iode (or dialectally lo iogurt, lo iode).

In case of apostrophation, the specific forms al (dial. as), del (dial. des), pel (dial. pes), cal (dial. cas) and can are broken and become a l' (dial. a s'), de l' (dial. de s'), per l' (dial. per s'), ca l' (dial. ca s') and ca n' respectively.

The feminine singular article (la, na and dialectally sa) are apostrophated in the following cases: When the following word start with a vowel: l'emoció, l'ungla, l'aigua, n'Elena; when the word start with a silent h: l'heura, l'holografia, n'Hermínia, s'horabaixa. It is not apostrophated in the following cases: When it goes before word that starts with a consonantic i or u (with h or not): la hiena; when it goes before a word that begins with unstressed i or u (with h or not): la humitat, la universitat, la imatge; before some specific terms like la una (when referring to the time), la ira, la host, la Haia (toponym); before the name of the letters (la i, la hac, la essa); before a word that start with s followed by a consonant, la Scala de Milà.

Traditionally, to avoid ambiguities, words beginning with the negative prefix a- did not take an apostrophe. Nowadays, general apostrophation rules are followed in written text: l'anormalitat, l'amoralitat, l'atipicitat, l'asimetria, l'asèpsia, etc. The Diccionari de l'Institut d'Estudis Catalans (DIEC) of 1995 started to apply the new criteria; however, it was never formulated explicitly. In the same way, the introduction of DIEC writes about the abnormality of the situation, and the outline of the new normative grammar that prepares the IEC already does not collect that traditional exception.

Preposition deThe preposition de takes the apostrophe before a vowel (with silent h, or without): d'aigua, d'enveja, d'humitat. It does not apostrophate however before the following cases: words that start with a consonantic i or u (with silent h or without); de iode, de ioga, de uombat, de iogurt, de Utah, de ouija; before names of letters; de a, de hac. In general it does not apostrophate in case of metalanguage: el plural de alt és alts; before a liquid s: de Stalin.

Weak pronouns
Weak pronouns take the apostrophe in the following cases: 

Before a verb that starts with a vowel, using its elided form: m'agrada, n'abastava, s'estimaran, l'aconseguiria. At the end of a verb that finishes in a vowel, using the reduced form: menja'n, trenca'l, fondre's, compra'ns. When there are two, the second if the orthographic rules allow it: me'n, li'n , se'm, te'ls, la'n, n'hi; if it is possible, it takes the apostrophe with the following word, like me n'ha dut tres. The apostrophe always goes the further to the right possible: te l'emportes, not *te'l emportes.

Does not take the apostrophe:

The pronouns us, vos, hi, ho, li, les: us el dono or vos el done, se us esperava or se vos esperava. Like in the case of the article, the pronoun before words that start by unstressed i and u (with silent h or without): la ignora, la hi pren, la humitejarem, la usàvem. It also does not take the apostrophe the first weak pronoun in the forms la hi and se us.

Capitalization
Catalan and Valencian do not capitalize the days of the week, months, or national adjectives.dilluns, setembre, anglès'Monday', 'September', 'English'

Punctuation
Catalan and Valencian punctuation rules are similar to English, with some minor differences.
Guillemets (cometes baixes) « » are frequently used instead of double inverted commas. They are used to mark titles of works, or phrases used as proper names.
In texts containing dialogue, quoted speech is usually set off with dashes, rather than inverted commas.
—Què proposes, doncs?—El que hauriem de fer —s'atreví a suggerir— és anar a...'What do you propose, then?'
'What we should do' she ventured to suggest 'is go to and ...'
Questions are ended with ?, as in English. Before 1993, questions could be enclosed with ¿...?'', as in Spanish, but this is no longer recommended by the IEC.

Other conventions
The distribution of the two rhotics  and  closely parallels that of Spanish.  Between vowels, the two contrast but they are otherwise in complementary distribution: in the onset, an alveolar trill, appears unless preceded by a consonant; different dialects vary in regards to rhotics in the coda with Western Catalan generally featuring an alveolar tap, and Central Catalan dialects like those of Barcelona or Girona featuring a weakly trilled  unless it precedes a vowel-initial word in the same prosodic unit, in which case  appears.

In Eastern Catalan and North Western Catalan, most instances of word-final  are silent, but there are plenty of unpredictable exceptions (e.g. in Central Eastern Catalan   'fear' but   'sea').

In Valencian, most instances of word-final  are pronounced.

See also
Catalan manual alphabet
Catalan Braille

Notes

References

Bibliography

 

Alphabet, Catalan
Indo-European Latin-script orthographies